Panshi is a city of south-central Jilin province of Northeast China. It is under the administration of Jilin City.

Administrative Divisions

Subdistricts:
Henan Subdistrict, Dongning Subdistrict, Fu'an Subdistrict

Towns:
Yantongshan, Mingcheng, Jichang, Quchaihe, Yima, Shiju, Futai, hulan, Hongqiling, Songshan, Heishi, Niuxin, Chaoyangshan 

Townships:
Baoshan Township

Climate

References

External links

 
Cities in Jilin
County-level divisions of Jilin
Jilin City